Pusar Ulak is a village in Bandar Seri Begawan, the capital of Brunei. It is officially a village subdivision under Mukim Kianggeh, Brunei-Muara District. The postcode for Pusar Ulak is BA1411.

Infanstructures

Education 

 St. Andrew's School – an anglican private school founded in 1956.
 St. George's School – an anglican private school established in 1937.
 Sultan Omar Ali Saifuddien College – the first government secondary school in Brunei, established in 1951.
 Pusar Ulak Primary School – a local government primary school.

Recreation 

 Sultan Haji Hassanal Bolkiah Silver Jubilee Park – a public park opened in 2004.

Religion 

 St. Andrew's Church – an anglican church that runs the St. Andrew's School.
 Church of Our Lady of Assumption – a catholic church completed in 1969.

See also 
 List of neighbourhoods in Bandar Seri Begawan

References 

Neighbourhoods in Bandar Seri Begawan
Villages in Brunei-Muara District